Keith Hicks (born 9 August 1954 in Oldham, Lancashire) is an English former footballer who played as a central defender. He made 475 appearances in the Football League during the 1970s and 1980s for Oldham Athletic, Hereford United and Rochdale, before moving into non-league football with Hyde United, Mossley, including a spell as player-manager, and Radcliffe Borough.

He is now a Football in the Community officer at Rochdale.

References

External links
 

1954 births
Living people
People from Oldham
English footballers
Footballers from Oldham
Association football defenders
Oldham Athletic A.F.C. players
Hereford United F.C. players
Rochdale A.F.C. players
Hyde United F.C. players
Mossley A.F.C. players
Mossley A.F.C. managers
Radcliffe F.C. players
English Football League players
English football managers